The meridian 132° west of Greenwich is a line of longitude that extends from the North Pole across the Arctic Ocean, North America, the Pacific Ocean, the Southern Ocean, and Antarctica to the South Pole.

The 132nd meridian west forms a great circle with the 48th meridian east.

From Pole to Pole
Starting at the North Pole and heading south to the South Pole, the 132nd meridian west passes through:

{| class="wikitable plainrowheaders"
! scope="col" width="130" | Co-ordinates
! scope="col" | Country, territory or sea
! scope="col" | Notes
|-
| style="background:#b0e0e6;" | 
! scope="row" style="background:#b0e0e6;" | Arctic Ocean
| style="background:#b0e0e6;" |
|-
| style="background:#b0e0e6;" | 
! scope="row" style="background:#b0e0e6;" | Beaufort Sea
| style="background:#b0e0e6;" |
|-valign="top"
| 
! scope="row" | 
| Northwest Territories Yukon — from  British Columbia — from 
|-valign="top"
| 
! scope="row" | 
| Alaska — Alaska Panhandle (mainland), Wrangell Island, Deer Island and Cleveland Peninsula (mainland)
|-
| style="background:#b0e0e6;" | 
! scope="row" style="background:#b0e0e6;" | Clarence Strait
| style="background:#b0e0e6;" |
|-
| 
! scope="row" | 
| Alaska — Prince of Wales Island
|-
| style="background:#b0e0e6;" | 
! scope="row" style="background:#b0e0e6;" | Dixon Entrance
| style="background:#b0e0e6;" |
|-
| 
! scope="row" | 
| British Columbia — Graham Island and Moresby Island
|-valign="top"
| style="background:#b0e0e6;" | 
! scope="row" style="background:#b0e0e6;" | Pacific Ocean
| style="background:#b0e0e6;" |
|-
| style="background:#b0e0e6;" | 
! scope="row" style="background:#b0e0e6;" | Southern Ocean
| style="background:#b0e0e6;" |
|-
| 
! scope="row" | Antarctica
| Unclaimed territory
|-
|}

See also
131st meridian west
133rd meridian west

w132 meridian west